Herman "Skeeter" Henry (born December 8, 1967) is an American former professional basketball player.

College career
After attending high school at South Grand Prairie High School, in Grand Prairie, Texas, Henry played college basketball at the University of Oklahoma.

Professional career
Henry, who was not drafted by an NBA team, played in seven games with the Phoenix Suns, four at the end of the 1993–94 NBA season, and 3 playoff games.

Teams 
 1990–1991 : Pensacola Tornados (CBA)
 1991–1992 : Birmingham Bandits (CBA)
 1992–1994 : Dijon (Pro A); Phoenix Suns (NBA)
 1994–1995 : Dijon (Pro A); Grand Rapids Hoops (CBA); Real Madrid (Liga ACB)
 1995–1996 : Sioux Falls Skyforce (CBA); Panteras de Miranda; Karşıyaka Izmir
 1996–1997 : Montpellier Basket (Pro A)
 1997–1998 : Cholet (Pro A)
 1998–1999 : Toulouse (Pro A)
 1999–2000 : Illiabum Clube
 2000–2001 : Dijon (Pro A)
 2001–2002 : Le Havre (Pro A)

External links
NBA stats @ basketball-reference.com

1967 births
Living people
American expatriate basketball people in France
American expatriate basketball people in Spain
American expatriate basketball people in Turkey
American men's basketball players
Basketball players from Dallas
Birmingham Bandits players
Cholet Basket players
Grand Rapids Hoops players
JDA Dijon Basket players
Karşıyaka basketball players
Liga ACB players
Midland Chaps basketball players
Montpellier Paillade Basket players
Oklahoma Sooners men's basketball players
Panteras de Miranda players
Pensacola Tornados (1986–1991) players
Phoenix Suns players
Real Madrid Baloncesto players
Shooting guards
Sioux Falls Skyforce (CBA) players
STB Le Havre players
Undrafted National Basketball Association players